Kamianske is a locality in western Ukraine.  It is in the Berehove Raion of the Zakarpattia Oblast, but formerly administered as part of Irshava Raion.  Kamyanske is also known as Kam'yans'ke (Ukrainian), Beregkövesd (Hungarian), Kivjažď (Slovakian), Kamenskoye (Russian), Kamenka, Kivyazhd, Kamjanske, and Szilicekövesd.  

It was formerly part of Czechoslovakia until 1945.

References

External links
JewishGen Locality Page - Kamyanske, Ukraine

Villages in Berehove Raion